Rob King (born 1970 in Los Angeles) has (along with Paul Romero) composed the music for the Heroes of Might and Magic and the Might and Magic series. He also created music and character sound effects for Everquest: Gates of Discord for Sony Online. In the early 2000s (decade), he was a member of the alternative rock band Red Delicious.

Rob King is the owner and operator of Green Street Studios, a private sound recording facility in Sherman Oaks, California.

References

External links

Green Street Studios
MobyGames profile

Heroes of Might and Magic
Might and Magic
American alternative rock musicians
Video game composers
American television composers
Musicians from Los Angeles
Living people
1970 births